Geographically Speaking was an American travel series that debuted on June 9, 1946, on NBC, and aired Sundays at 8:15 pm EST immediately following the game show Face to Face.

Originating at WNBT-TV in New York City, the weekly 15-minute program was one of the first TV shows to have a regular sponsor, Bristol-Myers. The show consisted of hostess Zetta Wells narrating her home movies of her trips with her husband Carveth Wells to unusual and exotic places. When she ran out of home movies, the series ended in December 1946.

Episode status
No episode of the series is known to survive in any archive, as it was broadcast live and there was no way to record live TV until the development of kinescopes in 1947. Even then, only a few TV shows were recorded.

See also
1946-47 United States network television schedule

References

External links
 

1946 American television series debuts
1946 American television series endings
American travel television series
Black-and-white American television shows
English-language television shows
Lost television shows
NBC original programming